K15MB-D is an affiliate of Home Shopping Network serving the Kansas City metropolitan area. It is located in Kansas City, Missouri.

It was founded in 1988, as K26CR on channel 26, as an affiliate of America's Store. It moved to channel 45 on March 24, 2006, changing its callsign to K45IO. The station was licensed for digital operation on January 10, 2011 as K45IO-D, and moved to channel 15 effective March 21, 2022 as K15MB-D.

K15MB-D is currently an affiliate of the Home Shopping Network and is owned by Ventana Television.

External links

Television stations in the Kansas City metropolitan area
Television channels and stations established in 1991
Low-power television stations in the United States
1991 establishments in Missouri